The Belleisle Bay Ferry is a cable ferry in the Canadian province of New Brunswick. The ferry crosses Belleisle Bay, a fjord-like branch of the Saint John River, linking Kars on the north bank to Long Point on the south bank.

The ferry carries up to 12 cars at a time, and operates 24 hours a day all year. It is operated by the New Brunswick Department of Transportation.

References

External links

Ferries site at New Brunswick Department of Transportation
Video of ferry in motion

Ferries of New Brunswick
Cable ferries in Canada